Roine is a name which is used as a masculine given name and a surname. People with the name include:

Given name
 Roine Carlsson (1937–2020), Swedish politician
 Roine Karlsson (1943–2013), Swedish race walker
 Roine Jansson (born 1952), Swedish artist and illustrator
 Roine Stolt (born 1956), Swedish guitarist, vocalist and composer

Surname
 Eila Roine (born 1931), Finnish actress
 Jules Edouard Roiné (1857–1916), French-American sculptor and medallist
 Siri Røine (born 1957), Norwegian civil servant

See also
 Roine (disambiguation)

Swedish masculine given names